Lontar may refer to:

 Lontar, a type of palm-leaf manuscript from Indonesia
Lontara, the palm-leaf manuscripts of the Buginese people of Sulawesi
 Borassus flabellifer, a palm known in Indonesian as lontar
 Lontar Island, an Indonesian island 
 Lontar Foundation

See also 

 Lontara alphabet, a scripts used for some languages of Sulawesi, Indonesia
 Lontor (disambiguation)
 Lotar (disambiguation)